is a fictional character from the Tekken fighting game series, who made her debut in Tekken 2, her first and only canonical appearance until the confirmation of her return in Tekken 8 when she was revealed as a character during a game play footage/trailer of the game at The Game Awards 2022. Following an ambiguous relationship with Kazuya Mishima, she became the mother of Jin Kazama. 

A nature lover, Jun plays an important role in the story in spite of her absence for most of the series. While she was cut from the main series after her debut, Jun has continued to appear in the series' spin-offs, including the Tekken Tag Tournament series, where her alter-ego, Unknown serves as the final boss in both Tag Tournament entries so far. Starting with Tekken 5, a relative of hers named Asuka Kazama started appearing in the games with the same fighting style.

Design and gameplay
Jun is a young Japanese woman with fair skin and short black hair. Her given name, Jun, is written as 準 which, while literally means "to conform", can also mean "pure", if written as 純. True to this, she is associated with the color white, which symbolizes purity and innocence. She is mainly seen wearing a sleeveless white shirt with black cropped trousers, white socks and black shoes, which is her main outfit in Tekken 2. Her alternate outfit consists of a light blue safari-themed outfit, which models her occupation as a member of WWWC organization. Tekken Tag Tournament adds a martial arts-themed outfit based on karate gi. That game's promotional images also has her wearing a simple, sleeveless white dress, which also appears in the game's opening. With the exception of the martial arts outfit, she wears a white hairband in all of her outfits. In her Tekken Tag Tournament 2 design, while her outfit still has a white theme, her left leg has a motif similar to her son Jin's karate gi, only with crows instead of flames, which may or may not symbolize her change in personality.

Jun practices "Kazama Style Traditional Martial Arts", which is a mixed martial arts based on other famous martial arts. It mainly based on Koryū and jujutsu. Some of her attacks were used by Jin in his Tekken 3 appearance and most were given to her relative Asuka as her main attacks. When she returned in the series in Tekken Tag Tournament 2, she was given a greatly updated moveset that, while still shares similarities with her old moveset, has a movelist geared to a more offensive style of attacking, and is made to differentiate more from Asuka's moveset. However, some moves from the previous game are removed.

According to Hyper, "Queen of confusion, Jun has the most befuddling attacks of any character" in Tekken 2. Her attacks generally deal big damage and she has many parries and excellent counter-attacks to use with enough patience. Her own attacks are very hard to parry, she can be very confusing in the hands of a skilled player. In Tekken Tag Tournament, Jun remains a specialist in defense, using her fast dodges, low parry and devastating counters. At the same time, her combos that strike at all levels make her also a good offensive character, retaining her potential for causing confusion and frustration. Once mastered, she can surprise any enemy. Her juggle combo capabilities are unlimited and, as always, her striking power causes big damage.

Appearances

In video games
Jun is an officer of the wildlife protection organization WWWC. She is called "The Chosen One" by her relatives. She is highly psychic, being able to sense that Kazuya Mishima's power stemmed from Devil. At the WWWC's orders, she sets out to arrest Kazuya, who smuggles environmentally-protected animals, Jun decides to enter the King of Iron Fist Tournament 2. When the second tournament was coming to an end, Jun comes to the realization that Kazuya's supernatural strength stems from Devil. But she is attracted to him by a mystic force beyond her control. Besides her duty to arrest Kazuya, who smuggles protected animals, she wants to free Kazuya of his evil power and drops out of the tournament as a result. At some point during this time, Jun became pregnant with Kazuya's child, whilst Jun was able to cause conflict within Kazuya, swaying Devil's hold over him, ultimately she was unable to prevent him from going to meet his father, Heihachi Mishima, in the tournament finals. After Kazuya is thrown into a volcano by Heihachi in the conclusion of the tournament, parts of Devil leave him and unsuccessfully attempt to possess Jun's unborn child. She flees to the forests of Yakushima, where she raises her child, Jin, away from evil and danger. 15 years later, before the events of Tekken 3, Jun senses the approaching of Ogre and warns Jin to seek out his grandfather Heihachi should anything happen to her. One night, Ogre attacks and knocks out Jin. When Jin wakes up, the Kazama's house has burned to the ground and Jun is missing. Jin is devastated and swears revenge on Ogre.

Although Jun did not appear in subsequent canonical games in the series, she is still mentioned throughout. She appears as a soul or vision in Jin Kazama's Tekken 4 ending, which persuades Jin to spare Heihachi's life in honor of herself. She is also mentioned numerous times by Jin and Kazuya during the prologue of the Scenario Campaign mode of Tekken 6, which retells the main events of previous games. Outside of the main series, Jun appears as a playable character in the non-canonical Tekken Tag Tournament as well as its sequel, Tekken Tag Tournament 2, where she is fought as a boss and transforms into Unknown in the final stage after defeating her. She is also playable in the free-to-play spin-off Tekken Revolution.

Jun made her return to the canonical story of Tekken in Tekken 8 as she was revealed to be a playable character during the gameplay trailer footage at The Game Awards 2022.

In other media and merchandise
Jun appears as one of the main characters of Tekken: The Motion Picture, which focused on Jun as she tries to free Kazuya from evil and stop him from killing his father, Heihachi. She is portrayed by Japanese actress Tamlyn Tomita in the 2009 live-action film Tekken, where, unlike in the video game series, Jun still lives with Jin well into his adulthood and is killed in a planned bombing by Tekken Corporation, leading Jin to participate in the Tekken Tournament to take revenge. She also appears as a main character in both the Tekken Forever comic and the ASPECT Comics' Tekken series.

In merchandising, Jun is featured as a plush toy based on her appearance in Tekken 2 and an action figure based on her appearance in Tekken Tag Tournament. Along with Kazuya, is featured in a Play Arts Kai series action figure based on her appearance in Tekken Tag Tournament 2,  created by Square Enix and launched at the 2012 San Diego Comic-Con. A "Tekken Bishoujo" series statue of Jun was released by Kotobukiya in 2014. A mix of hers and Asuka's outfit from TTT2 was released in the "Sexy" series costumes DLC for Soulcalibur V.

Unknown  (character)

 made her debut in 1999 in the non-canonical Tekken Tag Tournament, where she serves as the final boss. Unknown also appears as a rival unit in the tactical role-playing game Project X Zone 2.

Unknown appears to be a tortured soul who has been enslaved by the "Forest Demon" (which takes the form of a wolf-like appearance and appears behind her in fights, controlling and mimicking her actions). She has many demonic traits, such as glowing yellow eyes and no sclera, and a devil symbol tattooed on her upper right arm which resembles that of Jin Kazama's. Her default "costume" appears to have her otherwise nude body mostly covered in purple with short, dark brown hair, shiny body paint, or oil as if she had been submerged in it to her chest. Her second, alternate costume shows her dressed in the burnt, ripped remains of a dark brown dress, with bandages wrapped around her arms, shins, and instep.

Unknown did not have a story as Tag Tournament was non-canonical, though her ending shows her finally defeating the Forest Demon and therefore freeing herself. Her appearance as the final boss in Tekken Tag Tournament 2 looks like Jun's alternate form (black hair with a similar fashion to Jun, though her eyes have demon-like pupils and this time has normal white sclera). An artbook included in the Tekken 6 Arcade Stick Bundle revealed that she was meant to be Jun's sister enslaved by the "Forest Demon" before the scenario was ultimately dropped.

Similar to Mokujin, Unknown does not have an original moveset. Instead, she mimics other characters' fighting styles (with some exceptions), though her fighting style defaults to that of Jun Kazama. In Tag Tournament 2, she instead uses Jun's moveset with added boss-like moves such as summoning spikes and giant hands. In both her incarnations of the first Tag Tournament and its sequel, Unknown has originally appeared as an unplayable final boss in the arcade versions. She was later made a playable character in the console version of both games, with the former giving her the ability to freely switch her fighting styles using analog stick and the latter toning down her boss moves.

Reception
The character has been well received.  Common Sense Media said of Jun in Tekken: The Motion Picture that her character and morals give the film its only "shred of redeeming social value". According to GamesRadar, "despite a relatively minor role, [Jun] is kind of the linchpin for the whole series' continued plot." In 2013, Complex ranked Jun as the 12th best Tekken character of all time, stating that "even though she hasn't been playable in the main series since Tekken 2, Jun's influence continues to affect the other characters." Brazilian edition of PlayStation Official Magazine put her at sixth place on their 2016 list of "unforgettable" mothers in PlayStation games.

Upon her introduction in Tekken 2, she was perceived by some as having some of the most beautiful moves in the game. Over a decade later, her in-game model in Tekken 2 was listed by GamesRadar as one of the "ugly polygon 'babes' of yesteryear" in an article about attractive video game characters from older games whose low rate graphical in-game models belied their good looks, adding, "Jun always projected a sort of soft, nurturing femininity that contrasted sharply with her chosen career of punching people in the teeth." GamesRadar also listed Jun as one of the top ten gaming "MILFs" in 2008. In 2013, Unknown was listed as the tenth "fiercest female in today's fighting games" by Gamenguide. 

In the official poll by Namco, Jun was the most requested Tekken character to be added to the roster of Tekken X Street Fighter, raking up 16.41% of votes. Street Fighter producer Yoshinori Ono stated that Jun is the character he most wants to be included in the game, in addition to his desire for her to return to the main Tekken series. Tekken series' director Katsuhiro Harada acknowledged the high number of requests for Jun's return, stating that Jun was "missing", not dead like many believed and that he would consider her return to the series if he reached 5000 followers on Twitter and continued to receive requests for her from fans; this was greatly succeeded and surpassed, leading to her inclusion in Tekken Tag Tournament 2. As of May 2012, Jun was the 21st (out of 44) most used character in the online arcade version of Tag Tournament 2 up to that point. 

The narrative of Bloodline resulted in praise from the media for how the narrative offers multiple point of views of Jin's morals as he is trained by both his pacifist mother and his violent grandfather but the heavy focus on him over the supporting cast was criticized. Decider said Jun's training of Jin and their tragic backstory to be the only good story from Bloodline as a result of the emotional focus.

See also
List of Tekken characters

References

Action film characters
Female characters in video games
Fictional budō practitioners
Fictional empaths
Fictional female martial artists
Fictional Japanese people in video games
Fictional martial artists in video games
Fictional psychics
Tekken characters
Woman soldier and warrior characters in video games
Video game characters introduced in 1995